Kostol Navstivenia Panny Marie lies in the town centre in Považská Bystrica. It was built in the 14th century by János Podmanitzky owner of castle Považský hrad. It was rebuilt in 1940 to satisfy the need for capacity, leaving only presbytery, tower and northern part of girting walls of the old church. Nowadays paned windows were designed by Slovak artists Vincent and Viera Hloznik. In the entrance hall of the church is placed the gravestone of Raffael Podmaitzky, Szigmund Balassa and his wife Alzbeta Zborowska.

Gallery

External links
Parish Povazska Bystrica

References 
 Povazska Bystrica
Povazská Bystrica: z dejín mesta, 

Churches in Slovakia
Churches in Trenčín Region